Khoon Ka Karz is a 1991 Indian Hindi-language action crime film directed by Mukul S. Anand. It stars Vinod Khanna, Rajinikanth, Sanjay Dutt, Dimple Kapadia, Kimi Katkar, Sangeeta Bijlani and Kader Khan. The film deals with three individuals who are arrested for infringements under the Indian Penal Code: Karan (Vinod Khanna), Kishan (Rajinikanth) and Arjun (Sanjay Dutt) recount to the court how two of them were adopted and nursed by a saintly woman and how they fall in love with three women. It was dubbed and released in Tamil as Arasan: The Don in 2009, eighteen years after its original release.

Plot 

Arrested for a wide variety of infringements of the Indian Penal Code, Karan, Kishan and Arjun recount to the court how two of them were adopted and nursed by a saintly woman, Sarita Devi; how they fell in love with Tara, Sheetal and Sagarika respectively; how they took to crime; the transformation of an oil merchant to Hitler and Shri Ravan; and how they ended up being arrested by the police and in their present predicament.

After good-hearted Savitri Devi (Sushma Seth) was robbed of her baby by her criminal husband, she started raising orphaned children in an ashram, teaching them truth and honesty. But not all her children follow this path as grown-ups, e.g., Arjun (Sanjay Dutt) and Kishan (Rajnikant). Society didn't grant them access to a better future because they are orphans and poor, so they took on the criminal path and got in with dubious Champaklal (Kader Khan), whose son Robin (Kiran Kumar) wants to establish a mighty mafia imperium in India.

But Karan (Vinod Khanna), another former foster child of Savitri's, gives them a rough time as Savitri has begged him to save Arjun and Kishan from the path of crime. For this purpose, Karan gets help from his love, tough taxi driver Tara Lele (Dimple Kapadia), and even from Kishan's and Arjun's girlfriends Sheetal (Kimi Katkar) and Sagarika (Sangeeta Bijlani). But when Kishan and Arjun learn some unexpected truths, their aversion for Karan decreases a bit.

Cast 

 Vinod Khanna as Karan
 Rajinikanth as Kishan
 Sanjay Dutt as Arjun
 Dimple Kapadia as Tara 
 Kimi Katkar as Sheetal
 Sangeeta Bijlani as Sagarika
 Sushma Seth as Savitri Devi
 Kader Khan as Champaklal 
 Shakti Kapoor as Inspector P.K.
Sudhir Pandey as Hariya /  Rasiklal , Social Worker
Ashalata Wabgaonkar as as Judge Sumitra Devi, Sheetal's Mother 
Bharat Kapoor as Police Commissioner D.M.Mehta
Mehmood Jr. as Compounder of Champaklal

Soundtrack

References

External links 
 

1990s Hindi-language films
1991 films
Films directed by Mukul S. Anand
Films scored by Laxmikant–Pyarelal
Fictional portrayals of the Maharashtra Police
Indian crime action films
Indian gangster films